The Civic Trust Awards scheme was established in 1959 to recognise outstanding architecture, planning and design in the built environment.

As the longest standing built environment awards scheme in Europe, since 1959, more than 7000 projects have been rewarded and the scheme has continued in its objective to recognise projects that have made a positive contribution to the local communities they serve.

The Civic Trust Awards is one of the only remaining independent built environment awards schemes, not linked to any organisation, institution or publication and operates on a not-for-profit basis. We also provide an opportunity for the general public to participate in nominating and judging schemes from their local area.

The aim of the Civic Trust Awards is to encourage the very best in architecture and environmental design, to improve the built environment for us all through design, sustainability, inclusiveness and accessibility, but also to reward projects that offer a positive cultural, social, economic or environmental benefit to their local communities.

History
The Civic Trust Awards were originally established in 1959 by Michael Middleton CBE of the Civic Trust to recognise outstanding architecture, urban design, landscape and public are which improve the quality of life for local communities.

The Civic Trust went into administration in April 2009, following the loss of a government contract. The Civic Trust Awards was successfully rescued from the administration process by former Civic Trust employee Malcolm Hankey and his wife Karen Hankey who continue to run the scheme on a not-for-profit basis as a Community Interest Company.  

Awards are given for buildings and schemes which were architecturally outstanding and made positive differences to their local community.  Wherever possible, at the first stage of assessment, entries to the Civic Trust Awards (and Pro-Tem Awards if the structure is still in place) will be visited by a team consisting of an architect and (where available) a universal design assessor, a community representative, a Local Authority planner and a Student Representative. This team reports its recommendations to the National Judging Panel (a group of experts in their respective fields) that make the final decisions on the level of award to be given.

The assessor team will be looking for schemes that use sustainable design and construction, have a positive impact on their local environment, and have well integrated and detailed access for all. Feedback is offered to all unsuccessful applicants and the decision made by the assessor team and National Panel is final.

For the Civic Trust AABC Conservation Award scheme, entries will be desk assessed by a group of specialist conservation representatives of the AABC.

Awards

The Civic Trust Awards scheme annually recognise projects with Special Awards, Awards and Highly Commended.

There are 3 entry categories - Civic Trust Awards, AABC Conservation Awards and ProTem Awards (for temporary buildings/structures). Projects can be entered separately into both the Civic Trust Awards and AABC Conservation Awards should all criteria requirements be met.

All schemes are considered on their own merits, with winning projects also considered for one of the Special Awards, such as Sustainability, Community Engagement etc.

The Civic Trust Awards also delivers an Awards scheme in recognition of architect and founding figure of universal design, Selwyn Goldsmith.

Established in 2011, the Selwyn Goldsmith Awards for Universal Design is delivered in parallel with the Civic Trust Awards application process, all CTA entries are automatically considered for the Selwyn Goldsmith Award. The winner will be selected by a specially convened panel of universal design experts with the announcement made at the Awards Ceremony in March each year. Universal Design is about ensuring that places work for all people, no matter your age, ethnicity, gender or ability. An environment or building that is responsive, flexible, welcoming, easy to use and occupy; allowing all to use with dignity and equality. The Selwyn Goldsmith Awards (SGA) seek to promote and applaud those schemes which achieve this and exceed regulation. To be considered for the SGA's your project should have gone beyond the building regulations, as a minimum using best practice guidance, putting people at the heart of the project and showing exemplar design.

Civic Trust Awards - Projects that make an outstanding contribution to the quality and appearance of the built environment. Award level schemes demonstrate excellence in architecture or design, whilst being sustainable, accessible and provide a positive civic contribution. 

Civic Trust Highly Commended - Projects that make a significant contribution to the quality and appearance of the built environment. Commendation level schemes demonstrate a good standard of architecture or design, whilst being sustainable, accessible and provide a positive civic contribution.

For more information, please visit the Civic Trust Awards website www.civictrustawards.org.uk

Previous award winners

 Hallgate, Blackheath Park, London, 1961
 Kingsgate Bridge, Durham, 1965
 Nottingham Playhouse, 1966
  Richmond Baths (now Pools on the Park), Richmond, London, 1967
 West Burton Power Station, 1968
 Severn Bridge, 1968
 M6 motorway between Lancaster and Penrith, 1971
 Renault Centre, Swindon, 1983
 St James, Guernsey, 1986
 Victoria Quarter, Leeds 
 Centenary Building, University of Salford, 1997
 London IMAX, 2000
 Blizard Building, 2006
 Saint Malachy's Church, Belfast, 2010
 Green Park Business Park, Reading, 2014
Cambridge Central Mosque, 2020
Windermere Jetty Museum, South Lakeland, 2020 
Battersea Arts Centre, Wandsworth, 2020 (AABC Conservation Award)
The Heart in Ikast, Denmark, 2020
For more winners

References

External links
 

Architecture awards
British awards
Heritage organizations
Organizations established in 2009
1959 establishments in the United Kingdom